A muhtar is the elected village head in villages of Turkey and in villages of the Turkish Republic of Northern Cyprus. In cities, likewise, each neighbourhood has a muhtar but with a slightly different status. Muhtars and their village councils are elected during local elections for five years. However, political parties are not permitted to nominate candidates for these posts.

Rural muhtars
In each village, the muhtar is the highest elected authority of the village. (There is no mayor in a village.) According to the Village Law, tasks of the muhtars are in two groups: compulsory tasks are about public health, primary school education, security and notification of public announcements, etc. Noncompulsory tasks depend on the demands of village residents.

Urban muhtars
In each town there are several neighbourhoods. In medium-sized cities, there may be tens of neighbourhoods, and in big cities the number may exceed well over a hundred. Each has a muhtar. Urban muhtars have fewer tasks than rural muhtars, ranging from registering the residents of the quarter, to providing official copies of birth certificates and identification cards.

References

Public administration
Turkish titles
Turkish words and phrases